Elitsa  (Bulgarian: Елица) is a Bulgarian feminine given name that may refer to

Elitsa Kostova (born 1990), Bulgarian tennis player 
Elitsa Todorova (born 1977), Bulgarian folk singer and percussionist
Elitsa & Stoyan, Bulgarian music duo
Elitsa Vasileva (born 1990), Bulgarian volleyball player
Elitsa Yankova (born 1994), Bulgarian freestyle wrestler

Bulgarian feminine given names